

This is a list of the Pennsylvania state historical markers in Franklin County.

This is intended to be a complete list of the official state historical markers placed in Franklin County, Pennsylvania by the Pennsylvania Historical and Museum Commission (PHMC). The locations of the historical markers, as well as the latitude and longitude coordinates as provided by the PHMC's database, are included below when available. There are 70 historical markers located in Franklin County.

Historical markers

See also

List of Pennsylvania state historical markers
National Register of Historic Places listings in Franklin County, Pennsylvania

References

External links
Pennsylvania Historical Marker Program
Pennsylvania Historical & Museum Commission

.
Franklin County, Pennsylvania
Franklin County
Chambersburg, Pennsylvania
Pennsylvania state historical markers in Franklin County
Tourist attractions in Franklin County, Pennsylvania